Levan Lagidze ((born 1958, Tbilisi) is a prominent Georgian painter.

He graduated from the Tbilisi State Academy of Arts.

Lagidze's paintings are in the collections of the Tretyakov Gallery and the  Modern Art Museum in Moscow, Russia; the National Picture Gallery in Tbilisi, Georgia; the Zimmerli Art Museum, Rutgers University, NJ, US; the Gertsev Gallery; and the TMS Gallery in Tbilisi, Georgia.

His works are also in private collections in Belgium, Canada, France, Georgia, Germany, Italy, Netherlands, Norway, Russia, South Africa, UK, the US and the Czech Republic.

Group exhibitions

 2007 - Artbull Gallery, London, UK
 2004 – Silent Auction to benefit the American Friends of Georgia – Doyle, New York, US
 1998 – ART SALON’98, Moscow, Russia
 1997 – “Going back”, TMS Art Gallery, Tbilisi, Georgia
 1996 – Galerie Seidel am Domhof, Cologne, Germany
 1994 – “The Beginning”, CA Global AC, Vienna, Austria
 1994 – Georgian Art, Steiner Haus, Bonn, Germany
 1993 – Georgian Art, Riviera Gallery, London, UK
 1990 – Georgian School – Drouot Auction, Paris, France
 1986 – Retrospective of Georgian Art, Central House of Artists, Moscow, Russia

Solo exhibitions

 2019 - Zurcher Gallery by Katrine Levin Galleries, New York, NY, United States
 2018 - La Galleria Pall Mall by Katrine Levin Galleries, London, UK
 2008 - Chardin Art Gallery, Tbilisi, Georgia
 2007 - Chardin Art Gallery, Tbilisi, Georgia
 2006, 2005, 2004, 1998, 1995 – TMS Gallery, Tbilisi, Georgia
 1994 – Central House of Artists, presented by Gertsev Gallery, Moscow, Russia
 1990 – Georgian Center of Culture “Mziuri”, Moscow, Russia
 1989 – House of Artists, Tbilisi, Georgia

External links
Artist's official website.
US Embassy hosts renowned Georgian Artist Levan Lagidze

Living people
1958 births
Painters from Georgia (country)
Artists from Tbilisi